Khaled Al-Shamrani (born December 4, 1995) is a Saudi professional footballer who plays for Al-Qaisumah as a defender.

References

1996 births
Living people
Saudi Arabian footballers
Ras Tanura SC players
Hajer FC players
Al-Nojoom FC players
Najran SC players
Al-Qaisumah FC players
Saudi Second Division players
Saudi Fourth Division players
Saudi First Division League players
Association football defenders